Mount Charles is a  high hill in St Elizabeth, Westmoreland Parish, Jamaica.

References

Geography of Westmoreland Parish
Landforms of Jamaica
Hills of the Caribbean